Chu Eun-yul (born July 11, 1968), better known as Chu Ga-yeoul, is a South Korean folk-pop singer and songwriter. He's known for his guitar skills and his most famous single, "Don't Go Away".

Career
Chu auditioned at SM in 2001 and received a standing ovation by Lee Soo Man. He signed with them that year. Born Chu Eun Yul, Chu was given his stage name, "Chu Ga Yeol", by Lee Soo Man. Lee even said that Chu's stage name was better than H.O.T.'s.

Chu taught Super Junior's Sungmin the guitar. On the radio show Ahn SeonYoung's Radio Is Good on May 19, Chu Ga Yeol said  "Among the hoobaes of Super Junior that I taught how to play the guitar, Sungmin is the one who learnt to play well right away. To see a hoobae like Sungmin’s improvement in guitar skill, I feel so proud and it's very rewarding." Sungmin had previously said to Chu "If there are chances, I want to play the guitar on stage with you." The two would later perform a cover of "Just The Two Of Us" at SMTown Live '08 and Chu Ga Yeol's X-Mas Concert.

Discography

Albums

Digital Singles

Other

Music videos

Concerts

Headlining
Chu Ga Yeol's X-Mas Concert – Sookmyung Art Center, Seoul (December 24 & 25, 2009)

Joint venture
SMTown Live '08 – Seoul, South Korea (August 15, 2008)
SMTown Live World Tour III – Seoul, South Korea (August 18, 2012)
2013 Good Friends Concert – Goyang, South Korea (January 12, 2013)

References

External links 
 Official Website
 Tower Records

Living people
1968 births
South Korean male singers
South Korean pop singers
South Korean singer-songwriters
Folk singers
Trot singers
K-pop singers
SM Entertainment artists
SM Town
South Korean male singer-songwriters